Zumsteeg is a surname. Notable people with the surname include:

Emilie Zumsteeg (1796–1857), German choir conductor, songwriter, singer, composer, and pianist, daughter of Johann
Johann Rudolf Zumsteeg (1760–1802), German composer and conductor